Eunice Williams, also known as Marguerite Kanenstenhawi Arosen, (17 September 1696 – 26 November 1785) was an English colonist taken captive by French and Mohawk warriors from Deerfield, Massachusetts in 1704. Taken to Canada with more than 100 other captives, the seven-year-old girl was adopted by a recently converted Mohawk family at Kahnawake and fully assimilated into Mohawk society. She was baptized as the Catholic "Marguerite" and renamed A'ongonte, meaning "she who has been planted as an ash tree." She eventually married a Mohawk man, François-Xavier Arosen, having several children and remaining with the Mohawk for the rest of her life. While choosing not to return to her natal family, she, along with her children, repeatedly made the trek to Deerfield to visit with her Puritan siblings over the course of her life. Her father, Rev. John Williams and her brother Samuel made numerous efforts to ransom her to no avail. Moreover, they failed to persuade her to return to Massachusetts and her birth family.

Early life and education

Eunice Williams was born on 17 September 1696, the daughter of the Puritan minister John Williams and his wife, Eunice Mather Williams. On 29 February 1704, the Williams' home was attacked during a raid on the settlement led by French and allied Abenaki and Mohawk fighters. Later called the Deerfield Massacre, the event was part of a series of raids and conflicts between the French and English and their Indigenous allies during Queen Anne's War in the early 18th century.

The attackers killed numerous settlers in their houses, including Eunice's younger brother John Williams, Jr. and six-week-old sister Jerusha. They took captive more than 100 settlers, including 7-year-old Eunice, her parents, and four of her siblings. The captives were taken on a strenuous march northward. The next day, a Mohawk warrior killed her mother after she fell while crossing the icy waters of the Green River. Other children and elderly captives were also killed if they could not keep up with the large party.

Eunice and the surviving members of her family reached Fort Chambly in Quebec six weeks later. From there, the Mohawks took her to Kahnawake, a Catholic Mohawk settlement south of Montreal across the St. Lawrence River. A woman who had recently lost her daughter in a smallpox epidemic soon adopted her. Eunice was given the symbolic name Waongote, meaning "one who is planted like an Ashe", and was instructed in the Mohawk language and customs, and catechized in the Roman Catholic religion. When she converted to Catholicism, she was baptized Marguerite.

When the survivors of Deerfield learned their captured relatives and neighbors were in Quebec, they began negotiations through various intermediaries to ransom them. During these years, Rev. Williams was allowed to meet with Eunice on two occasions; both times, he responded to her requests for guidance by telling her to recite the Puritan Catechism.

Later life
When John Williams was ransomed and freed about three years later, he wanted to have Eunice reunited with him. The French told an intermediary it was impossible because the Mohawks who adopted her "would as soon part with their hearts as the child." The French government would not generally interfere when the Mohawk adopted captives, even if they were European. He managed to retrieve his other children, who returned to live in Massachusetts.

Eunice became fully assimilated into Mohawk culture, and at 16 married a 25-year-old Mohawk man, François-Xavier Arosen. They had three children together. Nonetheless, Rev. Williams, succeeded by his son Stephen, continued through the years to try to ransom and later persuade Eunice to rejoin her New England family.

Eunice, called Kanenstenhawi as an adult Mohawk, eventually visited New England in 1741, after her father had died. Her brother Stephen had kept in touch with her. When Eunice and her husband went to Massachusetts, it was with a guide and interpreter, as they spoke only Mohawk and French. She made two more visits to her Williams family, bringing her children with her and one year staying for an extended period through the winter.

Timeline

Notes

References

Printed matter 

Haefeli, Evan and Kevin Sweeney. "Revisiting the Redeemed Captive: New Perspectives on the 1704 Attack on Deerfield," in After King Philip's War, Presence and Persistence in Indian New England. Colin G. Calloway, editor. Hanover: University Press of New England, 1997, pp. 28–71.  (pbk.: alk. paper)
Jennings, Francis. The Invasion of America: Indians, colonialism, and the cant of conquest . New York: W.W. Norton and Company, 1976. 
Lepore, Jill. The Name of War: King Philip's War and the origins of American identity. New York: Alfred A. Knopf, 1998.  (hc)
Melvoin, Richard I., New England Outpost, War and Society in Colonial Deerfield. New York: W.W. Norton and Company, 1989. 
Sheldon, George. A History of Deerfield Massachusetts: The Times when and the People by whom it was Settled, Unsettled, and Resettled, with a Special Study of the Indian Wars in the Connecticut Valley. With Genealogies, Deerfield, MA 1895 (two volumes)
Williams, John, edited by Edward W. Clark. The Redeemed Captive. Amherst, Massachusetts: The University of Massachusetts Press, 1976.  (Note: Williams first published this book in 1707.)

External links 
 A Historic and Present Day Guide to Old Deerfield
 Historic Deerfield
 Pocumtuck Valley Memorial Association
 The Captivation of Eunice Williams
 A Sermon Preach'd at Mansfield, August 4, 1741 -"The Power and Efficacy of the Prayers of the People of GOD"
 Eunice Williams' husband Arosen was one of the Mohawk negotiators of the "Treaty of Kahnawake"
 "Eunice Williams", Dictionary of Canadian Biography Online
 "The Deerfield Raid", Canadian Encyclopedia Online

1696 births
1785 deaths
People from Deerfield, Massachusetts
Colonial American women
People of colonial Massachusetts
Mohawk tribe
Captives of Native Americans
Captives of Native Canadians